The Challenge is a 1986 Australian mini series based on the 1983 America's Cup.

It was one of the first television productions by Roadshow Coote and Carroll. The series sold well overseas and screened in the UK.

Cast
 John Wood – Alan Bond
 John Diedrich – John Bertrand
 John Clayton – Ben Lexcen
 Bartholomew John – John Longley
 Richard Moir – Warren Jones
 Lorraine Bayly – Eileen Bond
 Jacki Weaver – Rasa Bertrand
 Tim Pigott-Smith – Peter de Savary
 Nicholas Hammond – Dennis Conner
 Ray Barrett – Bob McCullough
 Peter Phelps – Will Baillieu
 Ian Gilmour – Scott McAllister

References

External links

1986 television films
1986 films
1980s Australian television miniseries
1986 Australian television series debuts
1986 Australian television series endings
Films set in 1983
Films directed by Chris Thomson (director)